Kenny Davidson (born 14 February 1952) is a Scottish former footballer who played as a forward for Hibernian.

References

External links
 

1952 births
Living people
Scottish footballers
Association football forwards
Hibernian F.C. players
Dunfermline Athletic F.C. players
Livingston F.C. players
Scottish Football League players